KVIC 104.7 FM is a radio station licensed to Victoria, Texas.  The station broadcasts a Top 40 (CHR) format and is owned by Victoria Radioworks, LLC. KVIC previously broadcast on 95.1 until May 2013, when the station moved to 104.7, as a result of neighboring Ganado's facility moving to 94.9, per an agreement between Victoria Radio Works and Roy Henderson, owner of KHTZ, which was granted by the FCC. KVIC assumed the 104.7 frequency that KHTZ abandoned in Ganado, using the same specifications it had at the 95.1 frequency. Concurrently, KHTZ moved from 104.7 to 94.9 and upgraded power and elevation.

References

External links

VIC
Contemporary hit radio stations in the United States